Robert Rentoul Reed (March 12, 1807 – December 14, 1864) was a Whig member of the U.S. House of Representatives from Pennsylvania.

Robert R. Reed was born in Washington, Pennsylvania.  He graduated from Washington and Jefferson College in Washington in 1824 and from the medical department of the University of Pennsylvania in 1829.  He began the practice of medicine in Washington.

Reed was elected as a Whig to the Thirty-first Congress.  He was a member of the Pennsylvania House of Representatives in 1863 and 1864.  He died near Washington in 1864, and was interred in Washington Cemetery.

Sources

The Political Graveyard

1807 births
1864 deaths
Members of the Pennsylvania House of Representatives
Perelman School of Medicine at the University of Pennsylvania alumni
Washington & Jefferson College alumni
Whig Party members of the United States House of Representatives from Pennsylvania
19th-century American politicians